Samuel James Cooper (born January 12, 1977) is an American serial killer who murdered five men in North Carolina between 2006 and 2007. Convicted of five counts of first degree murder, Cooper was spared a death sentence and sentenced to life in prison without parole.

Early life 
Cooper grew up in an abusive home. Cooper's father regularly beat him, his Mother and his four siblings. He started beating Cooper by the time he was 3 months old, and the abuse escalated as he grew older. By the time he was 13 years old, Cooper stopped crying during the beatings, and, according to a psychiatrist at his murder trial, stopped "feeling fear or fearing pain."

Adult years 
Cooper committed numerous crimes as an adult, including several armed robberies in 1994. In 1999, while serving time for the robberies, Cooper and two other inmates escaped by attacking and overpowering their supervisor, then taking control of his vehicle. When he was in court to be sentenced for the escape several months later, Cooper attacked a deputy in court and unsuccessfully tried to take her sidearm. He was released from prison for these crimes in February 2006.

Murders, trial, and conviction 
On May 12, 2006, Samuel shot and killed Ossama Haj-Hussein, 43. On June 3, 2006, he shot and killed LeRoy Jernigan, 41. On April 27, 2007, he shot and killed Timothy Barnwell, 34. On October 12, 2007, he shot and killed Ricky High, 48. On October 14, 2007, he shot and killed Tariq Hussain, 52. He killed some of his victims during armed robberies.

Police arrested Cooper in November 2007 following a local bank robbery. Cooper was linked to the murders from a handgun he had dropped while fleeing the bank robbery. He eventually confessed to the murders.

Cooper was charged, tried, and found guilty of five counts of first degree murder. Cooper's defense team sought a life sentence, arguing that his childhood abuse had affected his mental state. Prosecutors sought a death sentence, pointing to his history of violence, saying that even if Cooper did suffer from mental disorders, they did not have any effect on his willingness to kill. The jury ultimately spared Cooper's life, and he was instead sentenced to five life terms without parole, one for each murder. He is serving his sentence at Warren Correctional Institution.

See also 
 List of serial killers in the United States

References 

1977 births
American people convicted of robbery
American serial killers
Living people
Male serial killers
People convicted of murder by North Carolina
People from North Carolina
Prisoners sentenced to life imprisonment by North Carolina